German submarine U-1058 was a Type VIIC U-boat of Nazi Germany's Kriegsmarine during World War II.

She was ordered on 5 June 1941, and was laid down on 2 August 1943 at Friedrich Krupp Germaniawerft AG, Kiel, as yard number 692. She was launched on 11 May 1944 and commissioned under the command of Oberleutnant zur See Hermann Bruder on 10 June 1944.

Design
German Type VIIC submarines were preceded by the shorter Type VIIB submarines. U-1058 had a displacement of  when at the surface and  while submerged. She had two shafts and two  propellers.

U-1058 was fitted with five  torpedo tubes (four fitted at the bow and one at the stern), fourteen torpedoes or 26 TMA mines, one  SK C/35 naval gun, (220 rounds), one  Flak M42 and two twin  C/30 anti-aircraft guns. The boat had a complement of between 44 — 52 men.

Service history
On 10 May 1945, U-1058 surrendered at Loch Eriboll, Scotland. She was later transferred to Lisahally, Northern Ireland.

The Tripartite Naval Commission allocated U-1058 to the Soviet Union. On 4 December 1945, she arrived in Libau, Latvia, as British N-class N23. On 13 February 1946, the Soviet Navy allocated her to the Baltic Fleet. She was renamed S-82 on 9 June 1949 then sent to the reserve fleet on 29 December 1955. On 18 January 1956, S-82 was redesignated a floating submarine battery recharging station PZS-32. She was struck from the Soviet Navy on 25 March 1958 and was supposed to broken up for scrap. But submarine was found with explosion damages sunken in Estoninan waters near island of Vilsandi

References

Bibliography

External links
 

 

German Type VIIC submarines
U-boats commissioned in 1944
World War II submarines of Germany
Ships built in Kiel
1944 ships